One Economy Corporation is a Washington, D.C. based, global, nonprofit organization that uses the power of technology to connect underserved, low-income communities around the world to vital online information and resources.

Founded in 2000, One Economy's mission is to ensure that every  person, regardless of income or location, can maximize the power of technology to improve the quality of his or her life and enter the economic mainstream.

One Economy brings broadband into the homes of low-income people, employs youth to train community members to use technology effectively, and provides public-purpose media properties that offer information on education, jobs, health care, and other vital issues. These initiatives target three barriers to sustained Internet use:  affordability, accessibility, and lack of relevant content. By creating strong public-private partnerships and engaging local stakeholders and community organizations, One Economy aims to create a comprehensive and sustainable digital network.

In April 2010, One Economy, in partnership with the Broadband Opportunity Coalition (BBOC), was awarded $28.5 million through the Broadband Technology Opportunities Program, run by the U.S. Department of Commerce's National Telecommunications and Information Administration. One Economy and the BBOC are  supplementing this grant with $23 million of private sector matching support.

Public-Purpose Media
One Economy offers multiple public-purpose media properties that connect low-income people to online information and resources that address a range of topics including health, jobs, money, education, and housing. Over 19 million people around the world have accessed One Economy's online resources since 2000.

The Beehive
One Economy's signature online tool, The Beehive, is a multilingual web portal that provides low-income individuals with online resources concerning financial services, education, jobs, health care, and housing.

Domestically, the Beehive has been localized for 26 U.S. cities. Internationally, the Beehive is available in Ethiopia, Nigeria, Turkey, Cameroon, Rwanda, Kenya, Jordan, South Africa, Israel, and Mexico.

Localization of the Beehive is used to target specific community needs. For example, the Beehive served as the first source of local news in the Bronx Mt. Hope community, which before that had been without such a service. The Beehive also provided targeted tax help services in the Cascades area of Oregon.

PIC.tv
The Public Internet Channel, PIC.tv, is a multimedia experience that encourages its viewers to actively take steps to improve their lives. One of the primary tools on PIC.tv is the Make It Easy toolbox, which connects audiences with relevant, local resources related to the content featured in individual videos.

Digital Connectors
One Economy's Digital Connectors program was launched in 2001, in Washington, D.C., and has since expanded to include more than 20 rural and urban areas nationwide. Similar programs have been launched in Ethiopia, Rwanda, Kenya, Cameroon, and Nigeria.

The Digital Connectors program identifies and trains talented youth, immersing them in certified technology training and encouraging leadership skills that prepare students to enter the 21st century workforce. These youth range from ages 14 to 21 and come from diverse backgrounds. Participants give back to their community by teaching technology skills to family members, friends, and community members for no less than eight hours of community service each week.

In addition to hands-on learning and community service work, Digital Connectors are also given the opportunity to learn about career paths through sponsored visits to technology companies, job shadowing programs, and campus tours. In return for their efforts, Digital Connectors receive new computers or stipends through their city's employment program.

Since its inception, nearly 3,000 youth have given more than 56,000 hours of community service through the Digital Connectors program. Digital Connectors have also trained over 15,000 families on how to use technology and online resources to improve the quality of their lives.

Access Services
To address the issue of accessibility to online resources, One Economy works with affordable housing organizations, other non-profits, municipalities, and technology companies to extend the benefits of technology to low-income people. One Economy builds "state-by-state affordable housing finance policies that promote inclusion of broadband into low-income households."

These digital inclusion programs offer free or low-cost broadband Internet access, affordable computer options, and capacity-building plans for local organizations that integrate technology into their work. As a result of these efforts, over 360,000 Americans have received broadband Internet Access.

According to One Economy, the results of a comprehensive technology strategy produce tangible results in a community; in Greene County, North Carolina, residents saw an increase in SAT scores, business and job opportunities, and the number of high school seniors applying to college.

One Global Economy
One Global Economy was founded in 2005, with the goal of expanding One Economy's domestic efforts to communities around the world. One Global Economy's methodology involves identifying underserved international areas and then identifying the key developmental issues facing those communities. One Global Economy consults with community members, collaborates with local organizations, and holds local workshops to discover what resources residents would like to have access to on their local Beehives. These web portals deliver "highly contextualized information on issues including employment, civic life, health, and education" and "equip low-income households and individuals with the information and resources necessary for social mobility and immediate improvement of their quality of life."

In addition to the global Beehives in Ethiopia, Nigeria, Turkey, Cameroon, Rwanda, Kenya, Jordan, South Africa, Israel, and Mexico, One Global Economy also operates a computer center in Durban, South Africa and recently partnered with e-Mexico to open a community technology center in Mexico City.

Much of One Global Economy's work is part of Cisco's four-year, $10 million commitment to the Clinton Global Initiative to alleviate poverty in sub-Saharan Africa. Cisco has partnered with four NGOs--Habitat for Humanity, Inveneo, One Global Economy, and Teachers Without Borders—to provide "affordable housing, community connectivity, online content and tools, and hands-on training" to sub-Saharan residents.

References

External links
 The Beehive
 PIC.tv

Non-profit organizations based in Washington, D.C.